The Audi Sportback concept is a concept car produced by Audi, shown at the 2009 North American International Auto Show. The Sportback concept, a luxury five-door fastback model, was regarded as a preview of two future models: the Audi A5 Sportback variant and the Audi A7. The Audi A5 Sportback later debuted in July 2009, followed by the launch of the A7 Sportback at the Pinakothek der Moderne art museum in Munich in July 2010.

References

External links

 Audi Sportback concept - Audi World Site

Audi concept vehicles

All-wheel-drive vehicles